The 2011 Regions Morgan Keegan Championships and the Cellular South Cup was an ATP World Tour and WTA Tour event held at the hardcourts of the Racquet Club of Memphis in Memphis, Tennessee in the United States. It was the 35th edition of the Regions Morgan Keegan Championships and the 26th edition of the Cellular South Cup. The Regions Morgan Keegan Championships was part of the ATP World Tour 500 series on the 2011 ATP World Tour, and the Cellular South Cup was an International-level tournament on the 2011 WTA Tour. The event took place from 13 February through 20 to February, 2011.

WTA entrants

Seeds

 Rankings are as of February 7, 2011.

Other entrants
The following players received wildcards into the main draw:
 Beatrice Capra
 Catherine Harrison
 Ajla Tomljanović

The following players received entry from the qualifying draw:

 Stéphanie Foretz Gacon
 Alexa Glatch
 Anna-Lena Grönefeld
 Heather Watson

The following player received the Lucky loser spot:
 Alexandra Stevenson

ATP entrants

Seeds

Rankings as of February 7, 2011

Other entrants
The following players received wildcards into the main draw:
 James Blake
 Juan Martín del Potro
 Milos Raonic

The following player received entry as an alternate:
 Lukáš Lacko

The following players received entry from the qualifying draw:

 Jan Hájek
 Robert Kendrick
 Michael Russell
 Ryan Sweeting

Finals

Men's singles

 Andy Roddick defeated  Milos Raonic, 7–6(8–6), 6–7(11–13), 7–5
It was Roddick's 1st title of the year and 30th of his career. It was his 3rd win at the event, also winning in 2002 and 2009.

Women's singles

 Magdaléna Rybáriková defeated  Rebecca Marino, 6–2, ret.
It was Rybarikova's first title of the year and 2nd of her career.

Men's doubles

 Max Mirnyi /  Daniel Nestor defeated  Eric Butorac /  Jean-Julien Rojer, 6–2, 6–7(6–8), [10–3]

Women's doubles

 Olga Govortsova /  Alla Kudryavtseva defeated  Andrea Hlaváčková /  Lucie Hradecká, 6–3, 4–6, [10–8]

External links
Official site

 
Regions Morgan Keegan Championships
Cellular South Cup
Regions Morgan Keegan Championships and the Cellular South Cupl
Regions Morgan Keegan Championships and the Cellular South Cup
Regions Morgan Keegan Championships and the Cellular South Cup
bg:Селюлър Саут Къп 2011
fr:Tournoi de Memphis 2011 (WTA)
pl:Regions Morgan Keegan Championships and the Cellular South Cup 2011 - kobiety